Dan Strugnell (born 30 June 1992) is an English footballer playing as a defender for Gosport Borough.

Career
Strugnell joined Bournemouth at under-12 level after being scouted from his junior school. In May 2011, he signed his first professional contract after graduating from the youth team, which he captained. In August 2011, he joined Southern Football League side Wimborne Town on a three-month loan deal. Strugnell made his professional debut on 18 February 2012, coming on as a substitute for Stephen Purches in a 1:0 defeat to Rochdale in Football League One. On 2 March 2012, Strugnell joined Southern Football League side Bashley on a one-month loan. In late November 2012, he joined Havant & Waterlooville on loan, finally signing with them after leaving Bournemouth in May 2013.

A few days after leaving Dorchester Town in December 2019, Strugnell joined Gosport Borough.

References

External links

Bashley Stats at Aylesbury United

1992 births
Living people
English footballers
People from Christchurch, Dorset
Footballers from Dorset
Association football defenders
AFC Bournemouth players
Wimborne Town F.C. players
Bashley F.C. players
Havant & Waterlooville F.C. players
Dorchester Town F.C. players
Gosport Borough F.C. players
English Football League players